Steven Francis Kanaly (born March 14, 1946) is an American actor, best known for his role as Ray Krebbs on the CBS primetime soap opera Dallas.

Early life and career
Kanaly was born in Burbank, California, and grew up in the San Fernando Valley. He attended California State University, Northridge. Kanaly served in the Vietnam War as a radio operator with the First Air Cavalry Division. He provided details of his experiences in the service to Apocalypse Now screenwriter John Milius for scenes in the film involving the character of Colonel Bill Kilgore (Robert Duvall). He once described how he entered film acting-

Kanaly is best known for his role as Ray Krebbs, foreman of the Southfork Ranch, on the prime-time soap opera Dallas from 1978 to 1989. He reprised the role for the final episode of the series in 1991, and again for the made-for-TV reunion movie Dallas: War of the Ewings (1998). He reprised the role again in the 2012 TNT revival attending his nephew Christopher's wedding. In 2013, Kanaly reprised the role of Ray Krebbs to attend the funeral of J. R. Ewing.

During Dallas' run, he also guested in other series, including Time Express in 1979. From 1994 to 1995, he also had a role on the ABC daytime drama series All My Children as Seabone Hunkle, the father of Dixie Cooney Martin (played by Cady McClain). Kanaly has also guest starred on numerous other television series. In film, he collaborated frequently with writer-director John Milius, appearing in, among others, The Life and Times of Judge Roy Bean, Dillinger, The Wind and the Lion and Big Wednesday. Milius befriended Kanaly when they attended the same shooting range in California, and turned him to acting by recommending him to John Huston for Roy Bean. Other film roles include The Terminal Man, My Name Is Nobody and Midway. He starred as J. T. Fuller in an episode of Walker, Texas Ranger.

Personal life
Kanaly recorded a radio public service announcement for CARE in 1981, and he and former Dallas costar Susan Howard were featured in 1992 NRA advertisements promoting responsible firearms ownership. He and his wife live on a ranch in Ojai, California. He is a highly regarded watercolor artist.

Filmography

Film

Television

References

External links
 
 
 
 January 1, 1982 WABC aircheck with CARE public service announcement

1946 births
Living people
American male film actors
American male soap opera actors
American male television actors
Male actors from Burbank, California
United States Army soldiers
Van Nuys High School alumni
United States Army personnel of the Vietnam War
20th-century American male actors
California State University, Northridge alumni